The 2014 World Kabaddi Cup is the fifth edition of the circle style World Kabaddi Cup, held from 7 December to 20 December 2014 with the Opening Ceremony on 6 December 2014 at the Guru Gobind Singh Stadium in Jalandhar. The tournament took place in Punjab, India.

Organization

The tournament is organized by the Government of Punjab, India. The dates of the tournament were first announced publicly on 30 August 2014. The opening and closing ceremonies were telecast live throughout India, with international broadcasting in Canada, United States, United Kingdom and Australia.

Participating nations
The 12-day-long event had 11 participating nations in the men's tournament, with 8 participating nations in the women's tournament.

Men's tournament

Venues
The games played at the following venues.
 Government College Stadium, Gurdaspur
 Multi Purpose Sports Stadium, Dhudike
 Nehru Stadium, Rupnagar
 A.S. College Stadium, Khanna, Ludhiana
 Guru Arjun Dev Sports Stadium, Chohla Sahib, Tarn Taran
 Guru Nanak Stadium, Ludhiana
 Lajwanti Stadium, Hoshiarpur
 Punjab Public School, Nabha
 Multipurpose Sports Stadium, Jalalabad, Fazilka
 Shaheed Captain Manjinder Singh Bhinder Stadium, Mehta Chowk Amritsar
 Shaheed Bachan Singh Kabaddi Stadium, Dirba
 Baba Kala Mehar Stadium, Barnala
 Guru Gobind Singh Multipurpose Stadium, Badal Sri Muktsar Sahib

Opening ceremony
On 6 December, the opening ceremony was held in the Evening at Guru Gobind Singh Stadium in Jalandhar. Sharry Mann, Harshdeep Kaur, Sonakshi Sinha and Arjun Kapoor appeared at this mega event.

Closing ceremony
On 20 December, the closing ceremony was held before the final match at Guru Gobind Singh Multipurpose Stadium, Badal Sri Muktsar Sahib. Miss Pooja and Gippy Grewal appeared to close the event.

Schedule
Note: All matches' timings are according to Indian Standard Time (UTC +5:30) 14 December matches in Hoshiarpur, Punjab were cancelled due to heavy rain.
15 December matches in Nabha, Punjab were shifted from Government Ripudaman Stadium to Punjab Public School.

Group stage

Pool A

 Qualified for semifinals

Pool B

 Qualified for semifinals

Knockout stage

Semi-finals

Third place

Final match

Women's tournament

Schedule
Note: All matches' timings are according to Indian Standard Time (UTC +5:30).

Group stage

Pool A

 Qualified for semifinals

Pool B

 Qualified for semifinals

Knockout stage

Semi-finals

Third place

Final match

Broadcasting 
Television

References 

Kabaddi World Cup
Kabaddi World Cup
Kabaddi World Cup
Kabaddi competitions in India